Chyki-Dębiaki (German: Reichsheim (1939–1944))  is a village in the administrative district of Gmina Tuszów Narodowy, within Mielec County, Subcarpathian Voivodeship, in south-eastern Poland.

References 

Villages in Mielec County